The meridian 31° east of Greenwich is a line of longitude that extends from the North Pole across the Arctic Ocean, Europe, Turkey, Africa, the Indian Ocean, the Southern Ocean, and Antarctica to the South Pole.

The 31st meridian east forms a great circle with the 149th meridian west.

From Pole to Pole
Starting at the North Pole and heading south to the South Pole, the 31st meridian east passes through:

{| class="wikitable plainrowheaders"
! scope="col" width="125" | Co-ordinates
! scope="col" | Country, territory or sea
! scope="col" | Notes
|-
| style="background:#b0e0e6;" | 
! scope="row" style="background:#b0e0e6;" | Arctic Ocean
| style="background:#b0e0e6;" |
|-valign="top"
| style="background:#b0e0e6;" | 
! scope="row" style="background:#b0e0e6;" | Barents Sea
| style="background:#b0e0e6;" | Passing just west of Kvitøya, Svalbard,  Passing just east of Kong Karls Land, Svalbard, 
|-
| 
! scope="row" | 
| Varanger Peninsula - easternmost point of the country
|-
| style="background:#b0e0e6;" | 
! scope="row" style="background:#b0e0e6;" | Varangerfjord
| style="background:#b0e0e6;" |
|-
| 
! scope="row" | 
|
|-
| 
! scope="row" | 
|
|-
| 
! scope="row" | 
| Passing through Lake Ladoga and Lake Ilmen
|-
| 
! scope="row" | 
| For about 3 km
|-
| 
! scope="row" | 
| For about 4 km
|-
| 
! scope="row" | 
| For about 7 km
|-
| 
! scope="row" | 
|
|-
| 
! scope="row" | 
| For about 3 km
|-
| 
! scope="row" | 
| For about 2 km
|-
| 
! scope="row" | 
|
|-
| 
! scope="row" | 
| For about 610 km.
|-
| style="background:#b0e0e6;" | 
! scope="row" style="background:#b0e0e6;" | Black Sea
| style="background:#b0e0e6;" |
|-
| 
! scope="row" | 
| For 474 km.
|-
| style="background:#b0e0e6;" | 
! scope="row" style="background:#b0e0e6;" | Mediterranean Sea
| style="background:#b0e0e6;" |
|-
| 
! scope="row" | 
| Passing just west of Cairo
|-
| 
! scope="row" | 
|
|-
| 
! scope="row" | 
|
|-
| 
! scope="row" | 
|
|-
| 
! scope="row" | 
|
|-
| style="background:#b0e0e6;" | 
! scope="row" style="background:#b0e0e6;" | Lake Albert
| style="background:#b0e0e6;" |
|-
| 
! scope="row" | 
|
|-
| 
! scope="row" | 
|
|-
| style="background:#b0e0e6;" | 
! scope="row" style="background:#b0e0e6;" | Lake Tanganyika
| style="background:#b0e0e6;" |
|-
| 
! scope="row" | 
|
|-
| 
! scope="row" | 
|
|-
| 
! scope="row" | 
| Passing just west of Harare
|-valign="top"
| 
! scope="row" | 
| Limpopo Mpumalanga - passing just east of Mbombela (formerly Nelspruit)
|-
| 
! scope="row" | 
|
|-valign="top"
| 
! scope="row" | 
| Mpumalanga KwaZulu-Natal - passing through Durban
|-
| style="background:#b0e0e6;" | 
! scope="row" style="background:#b0e0e6;" | Indian Ocean
| style="background:#b0e0e6;" |
|-
| style="background:#b0e0e6;" | 
! scope="row" style="background:#b0e0e6;" | Southern Ocean
| style="background:#b0e0e6;" |
|-
| 
! scope="row" | Antarctica
| Queen Maud Land, claimed by 
|-
|}

See also
30th meridian east
32nd meridian east

e031 meridian east